Thompson Hollow is a valley in Wayne County in the U.S. state of Missouri.

Thompson Hollow, also known as "Thompson Holler", was named after an early citizen.

References

Valleys of Wayne County, Missouri
Valleys of Missouri